Cəyli (also, Çəyli, Dzhayly, Dzheyilli, and Dzheyli) is a village and municipality in the Kurdamir Rayon of Azerbaijan.

References 

Populated places in Kurdamir District